Lubang Island is the largest island in the Lubang Group of Islands, an archipelago which lies to the northwest of the northern end of Mindoro in the Philippines. There are seven islands in the group. The island is divided into two municipalities. The largest settlement is the town of Lubang, the northwest end of the island. The southeastern half of the island is covered by the Municipality of Looc, which also has its port located in Barangay Agkawayan. The Lubang island group, which constitutes all the seven islands, are geographically distinct from any landmass, making it biologically unique - and endangered at the same time. The islands are under consideration to be set aside as a UNESCO tentative site.

Geography
The three smaller islands are Talinas, Mandaui and Malavatuan.

It has a lighthouse at the northwest end of the island.
It is the 34th largest island in the Philippine archipelago.
During the earlier part of the Spanish Colonial Era, Ambil was reported to be in eruption. But when it was climbed by German scientist Carl Semper in the latter part of 19th century, he found no evidence that it has erupted in historical times. It is the 93rd largest island in the Philippine archipelago. Together with the two smaller islands of Mandaui and Malavatuan, Ambil is administered under the barangay also named Ambil in the municipality of Looc.
It is divided into two barangays of Looc: Bulacan and Talaotao.

History
The islands were originally settled by a proto-ethnic group that eventually advanced into present-day Tagalogs.

The Spanish built a fort on Lubang Island, the San Vicente Bastion, on the western point of the entrance to Tilik Port.

After World War II, Lubang Island was where Hiroo Onoda, a Japanese army intelligence officer, hid in the jungles when the Allies reclaimed the Philippines. He engaged in continuous, and sometimes deadly, guerrilla warfare against the United States and later against Philippine Commonwealth troops and paramilitary police. Despite flyers being dropped by airplanes in his hiding area, he adamantly believed that the war was not over yet. In March 1974, he was officially relieved of duty, 29 years after the end of the war, making him one of the last Japanese soldiers to surrender.
An independent short film titled Onoda's War was released in 2016. It was shot on location around Vigo, Burol, Agkawayan and Looc. In July 2021 another film (2h 45 minutes in length), Onoda: 10,000 Nights in the Jungle was released at Cannes Festival. Werner Herzog's novel, The Twilight World, is a fictionalized account of Onoda's experiences on Lubang.

Administration
The islands are administratively part of the province of Occidental Mindoro and are divided into two municipalities: Lubang and Looc. Lubang covers the northwestern half of Lubang Island (Cabra Island included), while Looc covers the remaining half of Lubang Island plus Ambil, Golo and the other islands. Looc Proper is divided into three major sections: BonBon, Gitna and Kanluran.

Economics
Most of the population resides on Lubang Island, where Tilik Port is located. The main economic activity is fishing in the waters surrounding the islands and planting rice, garlic, peanut, and vegetables. However, with the islands fine white-sand coastlines, tourism is growing in economic importance.

Fauna
The Lubang forest mouse is endemic to the island.

Notes

References
 Hiroo Onoda (1974) No Surrender: My Thirty-Year War Kodansha International, New York, 

Islands of Occidental Mindoro
Beaches of the Philippines